John Horan may refer to:

 John Horan (rugby league), rugby league footballer of the 1930s and 1940s
 John Horan (sports administrator) (born 1958), served as 39th president of the GAA between 2018 and 2021
 John Horan (politician) (1908–1971), politician in the Legislative Assembly of Alberta
 John J. Horan (1920–2011), American businessman, former CEO and Chairman of Merck & Co.
 Johnny Horan (1932–1980), American basketball player